Redland is a set of free software libraries written in C that provide support for the Resource Description Framework (RDF), created by Dave Beckett (a former resident of Redland, Bristol).

The packages that form Redland are:

 Redland RDF Application Framework providing the C RDF API
 Raptor RDF Parser Toolkit for parsing and serializing RDF syntaxes (RDF/XML, N-Triples, Turtle, RSS tag soup, Atom)
 Rasqal RDF Query Library for executing RDF queries with RDQL and SPARQL
 Redland Language Bindings for APIs to Redland in C#, Java, Objective-C, Perl, PHP, Python, Ruby and Tcl

Redland is a mature set of libraries, in development since 2000 and closely conformant to the relevant W3C specifications.

See also
Semantic Web

External links
http://librdf.org/
http://md.devc.at/internet/semantic-web/rdf/redland-rdf (TM-hub)
http://kill.devc.at/internet/semantic-web/rdf/redland/tutorial

RDF data access
Resource Description Framework
C (programming language) libraries
Python (programming language) libraries
Free software programmed in Python